Low-key lighting is a style of lighting for photography, film or television. It is a necessary element in creating a chiaroscuro effect. Traditional photographic lighting (three-point lighting) uses a key light, a fill light and a back light for illumination. Low-key lighting often uses only a key light, optionally controlled with a fill light or a simple reflector. 

Low key light accentuates the contours of the subject by throwing areas into shade while a fill light or reflector may illuminate the shadow areas to control contrast. The relative strength of key-to-fill, known as the lighting ratio, can be measured using a light meter. Low key lighting has a higher lighting ratio, e.g., 8:1, than high-key lighting, which can approach 1:1. 

The term "low key" is also used in cinematography and photography to refer to any scene with a high lighting ratio, especially if there is a predominance of shadowy areas. It tends to heighten the sense of alienation felt by the viewer, hence is typically used in dark dramas/ thrillers, film noir, and horror genres.  Low-key lighting is also associated with German Expressionism.

See also 

 Low-key photography
 Contre-jour
 High-key lighting

References 

Photographic techniques
Cinematography